The 1906 Canton Bulldogs season was their second season in the Ohio League. The team finished 10–1, giving them second place in the league. The championship series between the Bulldogs and the Massillon Tigers was rumoured to be fixed.

Schedule

Game notes

References

Canton Bulldogs seasons
Canton Bulldogs
Canton Bulldogs